Colin Nelson (born 9 August 1991) is a Guyanese footballer who plays as a defender for S.U. 1º de Dezembro and the Guyana national football team.

References

External links

1991 births
Living people
Guyanese footballers
Guyana international footballers
Association football defenders
Western Tigers FC players